Mankono is a town in central Ivory Coast and the seat of Béré Region, Woroba District. It is a sub-prefecture of and the seat of Mankono Department. Mankono is also a commune.

Beninese politician Marie-Elise Gbèdo was born on 29 December 1954 in Mankono.

In 2021, the population of the sub-prefecture of Mankono was 74,165.

Villages
The twenty seven villages of the sub-prefecture of Mankono and their population in 2014 are:

Notes

Sub-prefectures of Béré Region
Communes of Béré Region
Regional capitals of Ivory Coast